Cercopithecini is a tribe of Old World monkey that includes several monkey species, including the vervet monkeys, talapoins, Allen's swamp monkeys and the guenons, all in Africa.

Classification 

 Family Cercopithecidae
 Subfamily Cercopithecinae
 Tribe Cercopithecini
 Genus Allenopithecus - Allen's swamp monkey
 Genus Miopithecus - talapoins
 Genus Erythrocebus - patas monkeys
 Genus Chlorocebus - vervet monkeys, etc.
 Genus Allochrocebus - terrestrial guenons
 Genus Cercopithecus - guenons
 Tribe Papionini

References 

 
Mammal tribes
Taxa described in 1821
Taxa named by John Edward Gray